Mountain View School Division is in the Parkland Region of Manitoba, bordering the shores of Lake Winnipegosis to the North, stretching from Lake Dauphin in the east to the Saskatchewan border in the west and bordering the Riding Mountains to the south. Mountain View is culturally diverse and consists of approximately 3,200 students in 16 schools in 7 communities (Roblin, Grandview, Gilbert Plains, Dauphin, Ochre River, Ethelbert and Winnipegosis).

List of schools

References

School districts in Manitoba
Parkland Region, Manitoba